James A. Hilgemann (December 22, 1916 – August 28, 1967) was an American professional basketball player. He played in the National Basketball League for the Fort Wayne General Electrics in 1937–38 and the Fort Wayne Zollner Pistons at the start of the 1941–42 season. In 21 career games, he averaged 6.3 points per game. Hilgemann also served in World War II.

References

1916 births
1967 deaths
American men's basketball players
United States Army personnel of World War II
Basketball players from Indiana
Fort Wayne General Electrics players
Fort Wayne Zollner Pistons players
Guards (basketball)
People from Wabash, Indiana
Toledo Rockets men's basketball players